The Boston Breakers were an American professional soccer club based in the Boston neighborhood of Allston. The team competed in the National Women's Soccer League (NWSL).  They replaced the original Breakers, who competed in the defunct Women's United Soccer Association, as the Boston area's professional women's soccer team.

The Breakers played their home games at Jordan Field in Boston and were managed in their final season by Matt Beard.

History

Original franchise

The original Boston Breakers played in the WUSA from 2001 to 2003. In the final season in the WUSA, the Breakers had their best record (10–4–7) and placed first in the regular season before losing to the Washington Freedom in the semifinals.

Women's Professional Soccer

Re-establishment (2007–2009) 

The formation of Women's Professional Soccer was announced on September 4, 2007, during which time it was also announced that a franchise had been awarded to Boston.

The Boston Breakers franchise was officially unveiled on October 26, 2008. At the time it was the only professional women's sports team in Massachusetts. Joe Cummings was named the President and General Manager and he had previously worked for the Breakers franchise in the WUSA. In September 2007, Tony DiCicco was appointed as the club's first head coach.

During the WPS national team player allocation on September 16, 2008 the Breakers acquired Heather Mitts and former Breakers players, Kristine Lilly and Angela Hucles. The club acquired Amy Rodriguez as the first overall pick in the 2009 WPS Soccer Draft in St. Louis on January 30, 2009.

2009 season 

The Breakers played their debut match in the inaugural season of Women's Professional Soccer against FC Gold Pride in Santa Clara, California losing 2–1.
Its first home match was against St. Louis Athletica on April 11, 2009, in which the Breakers lost 2–0. The Breakers finished the season in fifth place with a 7–9–4 record.

2010 season

2011 season

2012 league suspension 
On January 16, 2012, the Breakers announced that they signed United States U-23 national team defender, Bianca D'Agostino. Australian national team forward, Kyah Simon, was acquired by the Breakers in anticipation of the 2012 season as well. Simon scored two goals against Norway in the 2011 World Cup, which advanced Australia to the quarter-finals. Her goals made her the first ever Aboriginal to score a goal in a World Cup tournament.

The league announced on January 30, 2012 that the 2012 Women's Professional Soccer season was suspended. On February 9, 2012 the club announced it would compete in the newly formed WPSL Elite for the 2012 season, with the expectation that it would rejoin the WPS for the 2013 season. The semi-pro league has no restrictions on the types of players, whether they be professional or amateur.

After the WPS suspension, goalkeeper Alyssa Naeher returned to her former club, Turbine Potsdam, after playing for the Breakers during the 2010 and 2011 seasons.

Women's Premier Soccer League Elite 

In 2012, the Boston Breakers joined the Women's Premier Soccer League Elite. The team finished in first place clinching the regular season title with an 11–3–0 record, the best season in the franchise history. They lost 3–1 against the Chicago Red Stars in the WPSL Elite semifinals. The team was coached by Lisa Cole.

National Women's Soccer League 
In November 2012, it was announced that the Breakers would be one of eight teams in a new women's professional soccer league sponsored by the United States Soccer Federation, the Canadian Soccer Association and the Mexican Football Federation. On January 11, 2013, the league held its player allocation for the national team players, with Boston receiving seven players, including two returning former Breakers Heather O'Reilly and Heather Mitts. The other players assigned to the Breakers were Anisa Guajardo, Adriana Leon, Sydney Leroux, Cecilia Santiago, and Rhian Wilkinson.

2013 season 

The 2013 Boston Breakers season was the club's eighth overall year of existence, fourth consecutive year, and first year as a member of the National Women's Soccer League. They played 22 games, finishing with 8 wins, 6 draws, and 8 losses. They did not qualify for the post-season playoffs, and finished the season at fifth place in an eight team league.

2014 season 

The 2014 Boston Breakers season was the club's ninth overall year of existence, fifth consecutive year, and second year as a member of the National Women's Soccer League. They played 24 games, finishing with 6 wins, 2 draws, and 16 losses. They did not qualify for the post-season playoffs, and finished the season at eighth place in a nine team league.

2015 season 

The 2015 Boston Breakers season, was the club's tenth overall year of existence, sixth consecutive year, and third year as a member of the National Women's Soccer League.  They played 20 games, finishing with 4 wins, 3 draws, and 13 losses. They did not qualify for the post-season playoffs, and finished the season at ninth place in a nine team league.

2016 season 

The 2016 Boston Breakers season was the club's eleventh overall year of existence, seventh consecutive year, and fourth year as a member of the National Women's Soccer League. They played 20 games, finishing with 3 wins, 2 draws, and 15 losses. They did not qualify for the post-season playoffs, and finished the season at tenth place in a ten team league.

2017 season 

The 2017 Boston Breakers season was the club's twelfth overall year of existence, eighth consecutive year, and fifth year as a member of the National Women's Soccer League. They played 24 games, finishing with 4 wins, 7 draws, and 13 losses. They did not qualify for the post-season playoffs, and finished the season in ninth place of a ten team league.

2018 season 

After failed last-minute attempts to sell the club to the owners of the New England Revolution and to local commercial real estate developers, the Boston Breakers officially folded on January 25, 2018 and did not participate in the NWSL in 2018.  Reports generally blamed lack of marketing and resultant limited fanbase for the club's demise.

Stadium

Jordan Field (2014–2017)
The Boston Breakers played their home games for their final four seasons at Jordan Field, a 4,100 seat, multi-purpose facility located on the campus of Harvard University in Allston, Massachusetts.  Jordan Field was formerly known as Soldiers Field Soccer Stadium.

Dilboy Stadium (2012–2013)
The Breakers played at Dilboy Stadium in the Boston suburb of Somerville, Massachusetts for their 2012 and 2013 seasons, the move from Harvard to Dilboy concurrent with their league move to the WPSL Elite.

Harvard Stadium (2009–2011)
Boston used Harvard Stadium, the 30,323 seat home football stadium of the Harvard Crimson, from 2009 through 2011.  In 2012, shortly after joining the newly created Women's Premier Soccer League Elite, the Breakers moved their home field to Jordan Field.

Broadcasting 

As of 2017, Boston Breakers games were streamed exclusively by Go90 for American audiences and via the NWSL website for international viewers. As part of a three-year agreement with A&E Networks, Lifetime broadcasts one NWSL Game of the Week on Saturday afternoons. The Breakers were featured in the nationally televised Game of the Week on September 2, 2017.

Previous seasons' games were broadcast on YouTube, MediaBoss Television, ESPN, and Fox Sports.

Supporters 
The team had an official supporters group called the Boston Armada  as well as an independent supporters group called the Riptide, who cheered from a standing section known as "The Dock".

Players and coaches

Final roster

Head coaches 
  Matt Beard (2016–2017)
  Tom Durkin (2014–2015)
  Cat Whitehill (2013) (interim)
  Lisa Cole (2012–2013)
  Tony DiCicco (2009–2011)

Ownership and team management 
Michael Stoller was the managing partner of Boston Women's Soccer, LLC, the ownership group overseeing the Breakers.

Records and statistics

Honors

Individual Player Awards 
 Amy LePeilbet, WPS 2009, 2010 Defender of the Year

Player of the Week

Player of the Month

Pillars of Excellence 

In summer 2009, the Breakers began a tradition of honoring legends from the past with commemorative banners at Harvard Stadium. The award's Pillars of Excellence name was influenced by the stadium's iconic colonnade. Players from both Boston Breakers (WUSA) and the WPS/WPSL Elite/NWSL entry are considered.

Maren Meinert became the first inductee during a halftime ceremony on May 17, 2009 when the Breakers hosted the Washington Freedom. During her final season in 2003 Meinert was named the WUSA's Most Valuable Player for the regular season and MVP of the WUSA All-Star Game. Angela Hucles was inducted on May 1, 2010 during a home game against the Chicago Red Stars. Kristine Lilly was inducted during halftime of a match against the Philadelphia Independence May 23, 2011. Leslie Osborne was inducted during halftime of a home game against Sky Blue FC.

Supporters Award 
In 2017 the official supporters group of the Boston Breakers, The Boston Armada, began a tradition of awarding one player at each home game with a supporters award.  Officially dubbed, "The Chunk Award", it recognizes a player's individual contribution to the team during the match.  The trophy for 2017 is representative of the unofficial mascot of the Boston Breakers, "Chunk", a British Bulldog owned by Boston Breakers Academy Head Coach, Lee Billard.

See also 

 List of top-division football clubs in CONCACAF countries
 List of professional sports teams in the United States and Canada
 Boston Breakers (WUSA)

References

External links 

 
 Boston Breakers News at NWSL News

 
2008 establishments in Massachusetts
Association football clubs established in 2008
Soccer clubs in Massachusetts
National Women's Soccer League teams
Soccer clubs in Boston
Women's Professional Soccer teams
Women's soccer clubs in the United States
Women's Premier Soccer League Elite teams
2018 disestablishments in Massachusetts
Association football clubs disestablished in 2018
Women's sports in Massachusetts